The Tohokushinsha Film and Ministry of Internal Affairs and Communications scandal was a major political scandal in Japan involving the government of Prime Minister Shinzo Abe and the Deputy Minister Yoshihide Suga from 2012 to 2021, which led to the government's Abenomics financial policy.

Facts 

Article 75 of the Radio Act provides for the revocation of a radio station's license if foreign companies and individuals own more than 20% of a certain broadcasting company in Japan.

Tohokushinsha Film Corporation which operated the satellite channel as a major broadcaster, discovered the illegal status of its foreign shareholding in August 2017. By the end of the month, the situation had been reported to the head of the General Affairs Division of the Ministry of Internal Affairs and Communications (MIC), but the MIC has neither revocated Tohokushinsha's license nor requested the entity to take some actions to rectify the violation.

Cover-ups and its unraveling

Initial report 
On 3 February, the Shukan Bunshun released its report and evidence photographs that cast doubt on the MIC officials not to have recalled the company on the contrary of being informed of a legal violation regarding foreign ownership of the broadcasting company, due to the illegal preferential treatment from its executives including Seigoh Suga, the son of Deputy Prime Minister Yoshihide Suga.

Investigation committee by the party 
On 12 February, Tohokushinsha set up an investigation committee to scrutinize the entertainment for officials by its own executives The committee eventually found that 13 MIC officials had been treated to lavish meals and wines on 54 occasions and that 20 times of those dinners were not listed in the reception reports published by the MIC from July 2016 until December 2020.

The internal inspection 
The Tohokushinsha's reception with its president contained Taxi-tickets, lavish food, and other gift souvenirs to go.

The second report and denials
On 3 March, the Shukan Bunshun revealed the similar entertainments by NTT to the MIC officials.

On the same day, House of Representatives Budget Committee summoned Taniwaki who then testified that the MIC did not violate the National Public Service Ethics Act.

The review committee of MIC 
The MIC announced that it would set up a review committee of experts, to be chaired by the State Minister for the MIC , who was elected from Hiroshima, appointed to the State Minister by PM Suga and took office on 20 September 2020.

As a result, Shintani resigned from the role and the MIC reassembled the committee to exclude all MIC officials from its body.

The third report 
However, The Sukan Bunshun Online on 10 March revealed that Shintani's secretary was receiving entertainment from the Nippon Telegraph and Telephone Corporation (NTT) in November 2020, that Shintani and purnished Vice-Minister Taniwaki were schoolmates at the private school , and that Shintani himself was scheduled to have a dinner with Tohokushinsha in January 2021.

On 16 March, House of Representatives Budget Committee summoned Tohokushinsha president Shinya Nakajima, NTT president Jun Sawada, MIC's director of the Global Strategy Bureau, and Taniwaki again.  The MIC officials testified that they had not been informed of the violation by the company.

On 4 June, the MIC announced it had newly discovered that other executives had received a total of 78 entertainments from NTT or Tohokusinsha and punished 32 officials involved in the matter.

Backgrounds 
 1950 to current Inheritance Tax Act has the tax exemption rules for political funds and the asset of religious institutions.
 The draft of the United Nations Convention Against Transnational Organized Crime（UNTOC） came out December 1998, before the 2001 Central Government Reform led by Yoshiro Mori Administration.
 Shinzo Abe administration accepted the UNTOC and United Nations Convention against Corruption in 2017. Both conventions remained unratified in 2023.
 The National Personnel Authority was led by the Commissioner , a former judge of the High Court and later a member of the Tokyo Bar Association's legal professions, who was appointed as the President by PM Abe in 2014 and served 2 terms of 8 years until 22 June 2021.  For the similar period a Keidanren high executive , also served as one of three Commissioners. 
 Major newspapers in Japan frequently avoid reporting the names of foreign companies that own Japanese companies.

See also 
 Aikoku Gakuen Junior College

Notes

References

Further reading 

Foreign Exchange and Foreign Trade Act, 1949
The Broadcasting Act, 1950
The Radio Act, 1950
The MIC "Hoso bunya ni okeru gaishi kiseihoh Ihan no jirei" （The violation cases of the Broadcasting Act）.

2020 scandals
2020 in Japanese politics
Political scandals in Japan